Fungus-growing ants (tribe Attini) comprise all the known fungus-growing ant species participating in ant–fungus mutualism. They are known for cutting grasses and leaves, carrying them to their colonies' nests, and using them to grow fungus on which they later feed.

Their farming habits typically have large effects on their surrounding ecosystem. Many species farm large areas surrounding their colonies and leave walking trails that compress the soil, which can no longer grow plants. Attine colonies commonly have millions of individuals, though some species only house a few hundred.

They are the sister group to the subtribe Dacetina. Leafcutter ants, including Atta and Acromyrmex, make up two of the genera. Their cultivars mostly come from the fungal tribe Leucocoprineae of family Agaricaceae.

Attine gut microbiota is often not diverse due to their primarily monotonous diets, leaving them at a higher risk than other beings for certain illnesses. They are especially at risk of death if their colony's fungus garden is affected by disease, as it is most often the only food source used for developing larvae. Many species of ants, including several Megalomyrmex, invade fungus-growing ant colonies and either steal from and destroy these fungus gardens, or they live in the nest and take food from the species.

Fungus-growing ants are only found in the Western Hemisphere. Some species stretch as far north as the pine barrens in New Jersey, USA (Trachymyrmex septentrionalis) and as far south as the cold deserts in Argentina (several species of Acromyrmex). This New World ant clade is thought to have originated about 60 million years ago in the South American rainforest. This is disputed, though, as  they could have possibly evolved in a drier habitat while still learning to domesticate their crops.

Evolution 

Early ancestors of attine ants were probably insect predators. They likely began foraging for leaf sections, but then converted their primary food source to the fungus these leaf cuts grew. Higher attines, such as Acromyrmex and Atta, are believed to have evolved in Central and North America about 20 million years ago (Mya), starting with Trachymyrmex cornetzi. While the fungal cultivars of the 'lower' attine ants can survive outside an ant colony, those of 'higher' attine ants are obligate mutualists, meaning they cannot exist without one another.

Generalized fungus farming in ants appears to have evolved about 55–60 Mya, but early 25 Mya ants seemed to have domesticated a single fungal lineage with gongylidia to feed colonies. This evolution of using gongylidia appears to have developed in the dry habitats of South America, away from the rainforests where fungus-farming evolved. About 10 million years later, leaf-cutting ants likely arose as active herbivores and began industrial-scaled farming. The fungus the ants grew, their cultivars eventually became reproductively isolated and co-evolved with the ants. These fungi gradually began decomposing more nutritious material like fresh plants.

Shortly after attine ants began keeping their fungus gardens in dense aggregations, their farms likely began suffering from a specialized genus of Escovopsis mycopathogens. The ants evolved cuticular cultures of Actinomycetota that suppress Escovopsis and possibly other bacteria. These cuticular cultures are both antibiotics and antifungals. The mature worker ants wear these cultures on their chest plates and sometimes on their surrounding thoraces and legs as a biofilm.

Behavior

Mating 

Typically,  one queen lives per colony. Every year after the colony is about three years old, the queen lays eggs of female and male alates, the reproductive ants that will pass on the genes of the queens. Before leaving the nest, queens stuff some of the fungus' mycelia in her cibarium. These winged males and queens then take their nuptial flights to mate high in the air. In some areas, species flights are synchronized with all  local colonies' virgin royalty flying at the same time on the same day, such as Atta sexdens and Atta texana.

Some species' queens mate with only one male, as in Seriomyrmex and Trachymyrmex, while some are known to mate with as many as eight or 10, such as Atta sexdens and many Acromyrmex spp. After mating, all males die, but their sperm stays alive and usable for a long time in the spermatheca, or sperm bank, of their mate, meaning that many ants father offspring years after their death.

Colony foundation 
After their mating flights, queens cast off their wings and begin their descent into the ground. After creating a narrow entrance and digging  straight down, she creates a small  chamber. In here, she spits on a small wad of fungus and starts her colony's garden. After about three days, fresh mycelia are growing out of the fungus wad and the queen has lain three to six eggs. In a month, the colony has eggs, larvae, and often pupae surrounding the ever-growing garden.

Until the first workers are grown, the queen is the sole worker. She grows the garden, fertilizing it with her fecal liquid, but does not eat from it. Instead, she gains energy from eating 90% of the eggs she lays, in addition to catabolizing her wing muscles and fat reserves.

Though the first larvae feed on the eggs of the queen, the first workers begin growing and eating from the garden. Workers feed malformed eggs to the hungry larvae while the garden is still fragile. After about a week of this underground growth, workers open the closed entrance and begin foraging, staying close to the nest. The fungus begins growing at a much faster rate [] an hour. From this point on, the only work the queen does is egg-laying.

Colonies grow slowly for the first two years of existence, but then accelerate for the next three years. After around five years, growth levels out and the colony begins to produce winged males and queens.

The founding of a nest by these queens is highly difficult, and successful cases are not likely. After three months, newly founded colonies of Atta capiguara and Atta sexdens are 0.09% and 2.53% likely to still exist, respectively. Some species have better odds, such as Atta cephalotes, which are 10% likely to survive a few months.

Caste system 

Attines have seven castes performing roughly 20–30 tasks, meaning the potential exists for development of more specialized castes performing individual tasks for Atta's future. For now,  a reproductive caste, made of male drones and female queens, and a worker class, that vary greatly in size, are known. Queens have much larger ovaries than females in the working castes. Since their needs are constantly taken care of, queens rarely move from a single location, which is typically in a centralized fungal garden. Workers take their eggs and move them to other fungal gardens. Differences in size between worker castes begin to develop after a colony is well established.

Workers

Description 
Lower attines have very minor polymorphism within the minor workers, though higher attines commonly have very different sizes of worker ants. In the higher attines, though, head width varies eight-fold and dry weight 200-fold between different castes of workers. The size differences in workers is nearly nonexistent in newly founded colonies.

Due to the variety of tasks needed to be performed by a colony, the widths of workers heads are important and good measures of what jobs workers are likely to perform.

Workers need heads only about 0.8 mm wide to do the work of caring for the very delicate hyphae of the fungus, which they care for by stroking with their antennae and moving with their mouths. These tiny workers are the smallest and most abundant and are called minim. Ants of  appear to be the smallest workers that cut vegetation, but they cannot cut very hard  or thick leaves.

Attines, particularly the workers that cut leaves and grass, have large mandibles powered by strong muscles. On average, 50% of worker ants' head mass and 25% of their full body mass is the mandibular muscles alone.

Behavior 
Though all castes defend their nests in the event of invasion, a true soldier caste, with individuals called majors, exists. They are larger than other workers, and  use their large, sharp mandibles, powered by huge adductor muscles, to defend their colonies from large enemies, such as vertebrates. When a foraging area is threatened by conspecific or interspecific ant competitor, the majority of respondents are smaller workers from other castes, since they are more numerous, and therefore better suited for territorial combat.

Tasks are divided not only by size, but by the age of individuals workers, as well. Young workers of most subcastes tend to work inside the nest, but many older workers take on tasks outside. Minims, which are too small to cut or carry leaf fragments, are commonly found at foraging sites. They often ride from the foraging site to the nest by climbing onto the fragments carried by other workers. Most likely, they are older workers that defend carriers from parasitic phorid flies that attempt to lay eggs on the  backs of the foragers.

All size groups defend their colonies from invaders, but older workers have been found to attack and defend territories most often. At least three of four physical castes of A. sexdens change their behavior based on their age.

Habitat 
Lower attines mostly live in inconspicuous nests with 100–1000 individuals and relatively small fungus gardens in them. Higher attines, in contrast, live in colonies made of 5–10 million ants that live and work within hundreds of interconnected fungus-bearing chambers in huge subterranean nests.

Farming 

The majority of fungi that are farmed by attine ants come from the family Lepiotaceae, mostly from the genera Leucoagaricus and Leucocoprinus, though variance occurs within the tribe. Some species in the genus Apterostigma have changed their food source to fungi in the family Tricholomataceae. Some species cultivate yeast, such as Cyphomyrmex rimosus.

Some fungi that have supposedly been vertically transmitted are believed to be millions of years old. It was previously assumed that the cultures are always transmitted vertically from colony to young queen, but some lower attines have been found to be growing recently domesticated Lepiotaceae. Some species transfer cultures laterally, such as Cyphomyrmex and occasionally some species of Acromyrmex, whether by joining a neighboring tribe, stealing, or invading another colony's garden.

Lower attines do not use leaves for the majority of the substrate for their gardens, and instead prefer dead vegetation, seeds, fruits, insect feces, and corpses.

Worker recruitment 
The number of ants that are recruited to cut varies greatly based on the leaf quality available in addition to the species and location of the colony. Leaf quality is complex to measure because many variables exist, including "leaf tenderness, nutrient composition, and the presence and quantity of secondary plant chemicals" such as sugar.

Early studies found the pheromones used to mark foraging trails come from poison gland sacs. Studies suggest there are two purposes for marking the trails this way: worker recruitment and orientation cues. The trail recruitment pheromone  methyl-4-methylpyrrole-2-carboxylate (MMPC), was the first whose chemical structure was identified. It is also the main trail recruitment pheromone in all Atta species except Atta sexdens, which uses 3-ethyl-2,5-dimethylpyrazine.

MMPC is incredibly potent and effective at attracting ants. One milligram is theoretically powerful enough to create a path that A. texana and A. cephalotes would follow three times the Earth's circumference [] and that 50% of A. vollenweideri foragers would follow 60 times around the Earth [].

Harvesting vegetation 
Most harvesting sites are in tree canopies or patches of savanna grasses.

After following the pheromone trail to vegetation, ants climb onto leaves or grass and begin cutting off sections. To do this, they place one mandible, called the fixed mandible, onto a leaf and anchor it. Then they open the other, called the motile mandible, and place it on the leaf tissue. The ant moves the motile jaw and pulls the fixed jaw behind it by closing them together until the fragment detaches. Which jaw is fixed and which is motile varies depending on the direction in which  the ant chooses to cut a fragment.

The sizes of leaf fragments have been found in some studies to vary based on the size of ants due to the ants' anchoring of their hind legs while cutting, though other studies have not found correlations. This is likely because many factors affect how ants cut leaves, including neck flexibility, body axis location, and leg length. Load sizes that do not impact the running speed of the collecting ants are favored.

Often, ants stridulate while cutting vegetation by raising and lowering their gasters in a way that makes a cuticular file on the first gastric tergite and a scraper on the postpetiole rub together. This makes a noise, audible by people with great hearing sitting very close to them and visible using laser-Doppler vibrometry. It also causes the mandibles to move like a vibratome and cut through tender leaf tissue more smoothly.

The metabolic rate of the ants while and after cutting vegetation is above standard. Their aerobic scope is in the range of flying insects, which are among the most metabolically active animals.

The behavior of the foragers that bring the material back to the nest varies greatly among species. In some species, especially those that harvest close to their nests, the harvesters bring the litter back to their colony themselves. Species such as A. colombica have one or more cache sites along a trail for foragers to grab litter. The first carrier takes the segment a short distance toward the nest and then drops it. Another picks it up and drops it, and this repeats until the last carrier brings it the greatest distance until reaching the nest. Data does not show that this behavior maximizes load transportation, so scientists have explained this behavior in other ways, though the data are still inconclusive. One theory is that this type of task partitioning increases the efficiency of individual workers as they become specialists. Another is that the chains accelerate communication between ants about the quality and species of the plants being cut, recruits more workers, and reinforces territorial claims by reinforcing the scent markings.

Gardening process 
First, foragers bring in to and drop leaf fragments on the nest's chamber floor. Smaller ants then crush these fragments and mold them into damp pellets by adding fecal droplets and kneading them. They add the pellets into a larger pile of other prill.

Smaller workers then pluck loose strands of fungus from dense patches and plant them on the surface of the freshly made pile. The smallest workers, the minim, move around and keep up the garden by delicately prodding the piles with their antennae, licking the surfaces, and plucking out the spores and hyphae of unwanted mold species.

Nutrition 
Higher attine fungi grow gongylidia, which form clusters called staphylae. The staphylae are rich in carbohydrates and lipids. Though workers can also eat the hyphae of the fungi, which is richer in protein, they prefer staphylae and appear to live longer while eating them.

Cellulose has been found to be poorly degraded and assimilated by fungus, if at all, meaning that the ants that eat the fungus do not get much energy from the cellulose in plants. Xylan, starch, maltose, sucrose, laminarin, and glycoside apparently play the important roles in ant nutrition. It is not known yet how ants can digest laminarin, but myrmecologists E.O. Wilson and Bert Hölldobler hypothesize that fungal enzymes may occur  in the ants' guts, as evidenced by the enzymes found in larval extract.

In a laboratory experiment,  only 5% of workers' energy needs were met by fungal staphylae, and  the ants also feed on tree sap as they collect greens. Larvae seem to grow on all or nearly all fungus, whereas queens obtain their energy from the eggs nonqueen females lay and workers feed to them.

Bacterial symbionts 
The actinomycete bacterium Pseudonocardia is acquired by pupae from the workers that care for them two days after pupae eclose for metamorphosis. Within 14 days, the ants are covered in the bacteria, where they are stored in crypts and cavities found in the exoskeletons. The bacteria produce small molecules that can prevent the growth of a specialized fungus garden pathogen.

Attine ants have very specialized diets, which seem to reduce their microbiotic diversity.

Impact of farming 
The scale of the farming done by fungus-farming ants can be compared to human's industrialized farming. A colony can "[defoliate] a mature eucalyptus tree overnight". The cutting of leaves to grow fungus to feed millions of ants per colony has a large ecological impact in the subtropical areas in which they reside.

Genera

Acanthognathus 
Acromyrmex 
Allomerus 
Apterostigma 
Atta 
†Attaichnus 
Basiceros 
Blepharidatta 
Cephalotes 
Chimaeridris 
Colobostruma 
Cyatta 
Cyphomyrmex 
Daceton 
Diaphoromyrma 
Epopostruma 
Eurhopalothrix 
Ishakidris 
Kalathomyrmex 
Lachnomyrmex 
Lenomyrmex 
Mesostruma 
Microdaceton 
Mycetagroicus 
Mycetarotes 
Mycetomoellerius 
Mycetophylax 
Mycetosoritis 
Mycocepurus 
Myrmicocrypta 
Ochetomyrmex 
Octostruma 
Orectognathus 
Paramycetophylax 
Phalacromyrmex 
Pheidole 
Pilotrochus 
Procryptocerus 
Protalaridris 
Pseudoatta 
Rhopalothrix 
Sericomyrmex 
Strumigenys 
Talaridris 
Trachymyrmex 
Tranopelta 
Wasmannia 
Xerolitor

See also
Ant–fungus mutualism
Fungus-growing termites
List of leafcutter ants
Leucoagaricus gongylophorus

References

Cited texts 
 Hölldobler, Bert and Wilson, EO. (2009). The Superorganism: The Beauty, Elegance, and Strangeness of Insect Societies. W. W. Norton & Company.

External links

Myrmicinae
Extant Paleocene first appearances